Roni Peiponen (9 April 1997 – November/December 2022) was a Finnish professional footballer who played as a right-back. He retired in July 2020.

Club career

Molde
In November 2015, Peiponen moved from HJK Helsinki to Norwegian side Molde FK on a three-and-a-half year contract. On 1 April 2016, he was loaned to Åsane on loan from Molde. Following a successful loan spell at Åsane, he headed back to HJK Helsinki on loan until November 2017.

Peiponen retired from professional football aged 23 in July 2020 after dealing with persistent injuries. However, he returned to the sport in 2022.

Personal life and death
In 2020, Peiponen revealed that he had fallen ill with depression and took medication for sleep problems. 

On 1 December 2022, it was announced that Peiponen had died at the age of 25.

Career statistics

References

External links
Roni Peiponen at HJK Helsinki

1997 births
2022 deaths
People from Kuopio
Sportspeople from North Savo
Finnish footballers
Association football fullbacks
Veikkausliiga players
Eliteserien players
Helsingin Jalkapalloklubi players
Klubi 04 players
Molde FK players
Åsane Fotball players
Finnish expatriate footballers
Finnish expatriate sportspeople in Norway
Expatriate footballers in Norway